Tetrahymenidae is a family of ciliates.

References 

Ciliate families
Oligohymenophorea